Sansad Marg (formerly N-Block) is a street located in New Delhi, India. The street gets its name from the  Parliament House (Sansad Bhavan).

The Parliament House, designed by Sir Herbert Baker, is located at the one end of Sansad Marg, which runs perpendicular to the Rajpath in Lutyens' Delhi and ends at Connaught Place Circle.

Other notable buildings on Sansad Marg include, Jantar Mantar, Palika Kendra, National Philatelic Museum, Reserve Bank of India, Akashvani Bhawan (All India Radio), Dak Bhawan (Department of Posts), Sardar Patel Bhawan (Ministry of Statistics and Programme Implementation), Yojana Bhawan (Planning Commission of India), Press Trust of India (PTI), and Parivahan Bhawan (Ministry of Road Transport and Highways), Church of North India (CNI Bhawan).

References

Streets in New Delhi
Roads in Delhi
Odonyms referring to a building